Agali is a small town in Palakkad district in the state of Kerala, India. It forms a part of the Agali gram panchayat.

Silent Valley National Park
Agali is the nearest town for travelling to Silent Valley National Park.  There are three Lodges and several resorts in Agali town catering to tourists coming to Silent Valley, as the town is only 16 kilometers from the Park.

Demographics
As of 2011 Indian census, Agali village had population of 22,327 with an area spread over 76 km² where males constitute 11,239 and females constitute 11,088. Population of children in the age group of 0-6 was 2,346 where 1,195 are males and 1,151 are females. Overall literacy of Agali village was 79.9% lower than state average of 94% among which male literacy was 84.2% and female literacy was 75.5%. 

Agali grama panchayat had total population of 34,941 with an area spread over 153 km². Among which males constitute 17,393 and females constitute 17,548. Total number of households were 8,695 in the panchayat limits. Agali panchayat has administration over 2 revenue villages like Agali and Kallamala. Population in the age group 0-6 was 3,786. Total literacy of Agali grama  panchayat was 82.7%.

Transportation
Agali is 36 km from Mannarkkad in Kerala. The little town of Anakkatti on Tamil Nadu border is only 16 km from Agali.  Buses from Coimbatore come to Agali through Anakkatti and the distance is 45 km.

References

Villages in Palakkad district